Claudia Leigh is a fictional character from the Australian television drama City Homicide, played by Tasma Walton. Shortly after the actress relocated to Melbourne, she was approached by producer MaryAnne Carroll to appear in the series. Carroll asked Walton whether she would be interested in a recurring role. Walton had previously turned down several acting jobs, while waiting for the right one to come along and she was cautious about taking the City Homicide role. She revealed that she did not want a repeat of her Blue Heelers character Dash McKinley. However, Walton was immediately interested in Claudia's job as a criminal profiler and her semi-regular status. Walton's casting was announced on 1 February 2009 and she made her debut screen appearance in the second season episode "Rage", which was broadcast on 22 March 2009.

Claudia Leigh is a criminal profiler and psychologist. As profiling is not a big department within the Australian police force, dramatic licence was taken with Claudia and it was stated that she came up through the detective ranks, before becoming a specialised criminal psychologist. Walton explained that Claudia is fascinated with the workings of the criminal mind and comes from an intellectual approach. Walton described her as a pretty straightforward and assertive character. A major storyline for Claudia saw her tasked with putting together a profile for a case featuring a serial rapist, who has murdered one of his victims. Claudia unsuccessfully tries to get a confession from the prime suspect Daniel Worthington (Martin Sacks), before he is bailed. Daniel later follows Claudia home and attacks her. Walton said portraying the scenes was "challenging and required a strong level of emotional intensity".

Casting
On 1 February 2009, Luke Dennehy reported Walton had joined the cast of City Homicide as semi-regular character Claudia Leigh. Dennehy observed Walton last had a regular television job as Dash McKinley in Blue Heelers, a role she quit in 1999. The actress had turned down several acting offers, while waiting for the right part to come along. Shortly after she relocated to Melbourne, Walton was approached by producer MaryAnne Carroll to appear on City Homicide. Carroll inquired whether Walton would be interested in a recurring role. The actress was initially cautious about accepting as she did not want a repeat of the Dash character. Walton revealed "After three years of Heelers I decided that I didn't want to do a regular gig again. The beauty of Claudia Leigh is that she comes and goes." At the time of her casting announcement, Walton had already filmed one episode and would be filming more in the coming weeks. She later commented that she enjoyed her time on City Homicide and said her character was "really nice".

Development

Detective Senior Sergeant Claudia Leigh is a criminal profiler and psychologist. Walton was immediately interested in the part because Claudia's job is not a straightforward police role. She commented that it is something that is intellectual and different from her previous acting parts, saying "Claudia is a very different character. Dash (on Heelers) was quite impetuous, impulsive. Claudia is almost the polar opposite. She considers what she needs to say and comes from an intellectual approach." Unlike other cast members, Walton did not get to work with people who do her character's job in real life. She told a TV Week writer that profiling is not a big department within the Australian police force and explained "Usually what happens is you have detectives who do that sort of psychology work, but who also do something else, such as ballistics or forensics. We've taken a little bit of dramatic licence with Claudia. She's come up through the detective ranks but she's now a highly specialised criminal psychologist."

Walton stated that the role appealed to her because Claudia comes and goes. The homicide team do not always need a profiler, so she works elsewhere in the building and then comes in when the squad need a different angle on a case. The actress revealed that there would not be any romance for Claudia, saying "She's a pretty straightforward, assertive character, but still very feminine. She just comes in, does her job, then leaves." Walton explained to a Who magazine writer that Claudia often talks a lot and uses police jargon, so she had to learn large amounts of dialogue. She told the writer that if she had been on a morning shoot and was later asked about her lines, she would not be able to remember them. Following her introduction, Claudia plays an important part in a case that involves Bernice Waverley (Noni Hazlehurst).

In July 2010, Claudia is asked to put a profile together for a case featuring a serial rapist, who has killed a woman. The prime suspect is Daniel Worthington (Martin Sacks), who has an alibi and is due to leave the country in two days. Claudia tries using psychology to get a confession in the interview, but fails and Daniel is later bailed. Claudia is unaware Daniel has followed her home and as she is unlocking her front door, he pulls a plastic bag over her head and takes her inside. Walton told The Daily Telegraph's Darren Devlyn that the scenes portraying Claudia's attack were "challenging and required a strong level of emotional intensity over a long period of time." The actress explained that filming with Sacks was "fantastic", regardless of the material, as they had previously worked together on Blue Heelers. She also called the realisation that women had been in Claudia's situation in real life "truly frightening and tragic." Daniel confesses his crimes to a tied up Claudia, before stating that he intends to kill he too. However, Jennifer Mapplethorpe (Nadine Garner) arrives and as she fights with Daniel, Claudia shoot him.

Storylines
While leaving the homicide department, Clauda is approached by Simon Joyner (Daniel MacPherson), who asks for her opinion on a case involving a man who has deliberately run down a teenager. Claudia states that the man could have an impulse control problem or psychosis. She tells Simon that she will put a profile together for him later on. When Bernice Waverley's son, Josh (William Jarratt), is kidnapped by Billy Pierce (Simon Stone), Claudia briefs the team on the situation. She explains that Billy is a disturbed man, who perceives Bernice as the enemy. He believes she was responsible for his brother's sacking and subsequent suicide, so he wants her to suffer too. When Billy is brought in, Claudia guides Simon and Matt Ryan (Damien Richardson) through the interview. Claudia learns Duncan Freeman (Aaron Pedersen) has returned to full duties, after being beaten almost to death by two criminals, and confronts his Sergeant Stanley Wolfe (Shane Bourne) about the decision. Stanley tells Claudia that he understands her reservations, but he feels it is the best way to proceed. Later that day, Stanley explains that Duncan is going to be fine, but that Simon needs her help. Claudia talks with him and gets him to speak to a colleague about his issues. Claudia reprimands Allie Kingston (Nadia Townsend) when she upsets a victim involved in the sex-slave trade. However, they later get the victim talking and the case is solved.

Claudia also advises the homicide squad on several cases, including; a murdered toddler who was last seen with two young boys, the deaths of a young couple at sea and a serial killer who has preyed on ten women over twelve years. Claudia helps Simon when he is framed for murder and investigated by Susan Blake (Georgie Parker) of the Ethical Standards Division. Claudia confronts Susan when she learns that she used her to manipulate Simon. Claudia later tells Simon that she believes he is suffering from vicarious syndrome. When a business woman is brutally raped and murdered, the homicide squad ask Claudia to out a profile together for their prime suspect, Daniel Worthington. Homicide has two days to find the evidence that he killed the woman and raped two others, before he leaves the country. Claudia interviews Daniel using psychology to get a confession, but fails. Daniel is bailed and he follows Claudia home and attacks her with chloroform and ties her to her bed. He admits to the murder and rape and goes to shower. Jennifer Mapplethorpe arrives and she places her gun on the bed as she frees Claudia. Daniel returns and tries to attack Jennifer with a pair of scissors, but Claudia shoots him dead. Claudia later returns to work and helps the team in their investigations into the disappearance and murder of a young woman who vanished after a party and a suspect who has become a vigilante.

Reception
Watching Claudia's first episode, Dianne Butler, writing for The Courier-Mail, said "I believe I'll also struggle to take Tasma Walton seriously after hearing her describe a suspect as extremely intelligent. It's her first episode on Sunday night, and the series' last. She plays a police profiler. Police profilers are very big in television, you'd know that. You could say they're extremerly popular." While commenting on the team, Debi Enker from The Age stated "Worst affected is poor Tasma Walton in the largely thankless role of psychologist Claudia Leigh. Her job appears to involve sitting in the office and making smug pronouncements about human nature, with particular attention to perverts." Enker's colleague Farah Farouque called Claudia "po-faced". During the Daniel Worthington storyline, a TV Week reporter branded Claudia "pretty" and wrote that she "may regret her hard-ball approach" to the case.

References

City Homicide characters
Television characters introduced in 2009
Fictional Australian police detectives
Fictional police sergeants
Fictional psychologists